ratpoison is a tiling window manager for the X Window System primarily developed by Shawn Betts. ratpoison is written in C; Betts' StumpWM re-implements a similar window manager in Common Lisp. The user interface and much of their functionality are inspired by the GNU Screen terminal multiplexer.

Overview

The name "ratpoison" reflects its major design goal: it lets the user manage application windows without using a mouse.  Unlike other tiling window managers like Ion, ratpoison completely ignores the mouse (or "rat"), and avoids window decorations as much as possible. The default keybindings are specifically designed to not conflict with Emacs.

Reception

Mark Pilgrim, a frequent user, praised it for being "minimalist" and "configurable".  Jeff Covey found it "lightning fast and perfectly stable". Peter Seebach remarked that "the convenience and performance are impressive; the learning curve, however, daunts many users." Similarly, Brian Proffitt observes that "the key commands are well explained in this window manager's man pages, and whatever you do, read these first. The keyboard commands do make sense after some use but initially the learning curve is pretty steep." In the same vein, Bruce Byfield found it (and stumpwm) "virtually unusable until you read the documentation". Penguin Pete highlighted its suitability for Emacs users, calling it "not so much a window manager as a frame manager," but found it difficult to work with GIMP.

See also 

 dwm
 Ion
 Xmonad
 awesome

References

External links

Ratpoison:  and wiki
StumpWM:  and wiki
Comparison of extensible window managers – Comparison of Sawfish, Awesome, Xmonad, StumpWM, Qtile and so on.
The Internet Archive: The StumpWM Experience – A video demonstrating use of StumpWM

Free software programmed in C
Free X window managers
Tiling window managers
X window managers extensible by scripting